Pierre Boan (born 12 April 1925; possibly died 3 November 2011) was a French curler.

Teams

References

External links
 

2011 deaths
1925 births
French male curlers
French curling champions